The 2017–18 FC Krasnodar season was the seventh successive season that Krasnodar played in the Russian Premier League, the highest tier of association football in Russia. They finished the  season in 4th place, and as a result of FC Tosno failing to obtain a UEFA licence for there 2018–19 UEFA Europa League Group Stage spot, qualified directly for the Groups Stage of the UEFA Europa League. Krasnodar were also knocked out of the Russian cup at the round of 32 stage by FC Tom Tomsk and the knocked out of the 2017–18 UEFA Europa League at the playoff round stage by Red Star Belgrade.

Season events
On 2 April 2018, Igor Shalimov was sacked as the club's manager, with Murad Musayev being appointed as the club's caretaker manager the following day.

Squad

Out on loan

Transfers

Summer

In:

Out:

Winter

In:

Out:

Competitions

Russian Premier League

Results by round

Results

League table

Russian Cup

UEFA Europa League

Qualifying rounds

Squad Statistics

Appearances and goals

|-
|colspan="14"|Players away from the club on loan:

|-
|colspan="14"|Players who left Krasnodar during the season:
|}

Goal Scorers

Disciplinary Record

Notes

References

FC Krasnodar seasons
Krasnodar
Krasnodar